Brigitte Lamy (born 28 December 1950 in Épinal) is a French curler.

She participated in the demonstration curling event at the 1992 Winter Olympics, where the French women's team finished in seventh place.

At the national level, she is a French women's champion curler (1989).

Teams

References

External links

Living people
1950 births
Sportspeople from Épinal
French female curlers
French curling champions
Curlers at the 1992 Winter Olympics
Olympic curlers of France